Trachymene scapigera, also known as mountain trachymene, is a species of plant in the ginseng family that is endemic to Australia.

Description
The species is a robust rhizomatous perennial herb growing up to 50 cm high. The three- to five-lobed leaves form a basal rosette. Some 20–50 white to pinkish flowers are produced in an umbel borne on a 12–35 cm stem. Flowering takes place from December to March.

Distribution and habitat
The species was originally known only from the type specimen collected in 1899 near the Jenolan Caves, west of Sydney. It was subsequently thought to be extinct until two adjacent populations were discovered in the 1980s along the banks of the Boyd River in Kanangra-Boyd National Park in the Central Tablelands district of New South Wales, where the plants grow on flat or gently sloping ground in the riparian zone.

Conservation
The species has been listed as Endangered under Australia's EPBC Act. The main threat comes from human activities, as well as, potentially, inappropriate fire regimes and disturbance by feral pigs.

References

scapigera
Flora of New South Wales
Apiales of Australia
Taxa named by Karel Domin
Plants described in 1908